Aki Hyryläinen (born 17 April 1968) is a Finnish football coach and a former player.  Throughout his career, he played as a center-back. He is a legend of HJK Helsinki due to his 154 league appearances. He retired in 2002.

References

1968 births
Living people
Footballers from Helsinki
Finnish footballers
Finland international footballers
Association football central defenders
Helsingin Jalkapalloklubi players
S.C. Eendracht Aalst players
F.C. Copenhagen players
Viborg FF players
Fremad Amager players
FC Jokerit players
Veikkausliiga players
Finnish expatriate footballers
Expatriate footballers in Belgium
Finnish expatriate sportspeople in Belgium
Expatriate men's footballers in Denmark
Finnish expatriate sportspeople in Denmark
Finnish football managers
Helsingin Jalkapalloklubi managers
Veikkausliiga managers